Margaret Pedler (1877 – 28 December 1948) was a British novelist, who wrote popular works of romantic fiction.

Biography
Initially Pedler studied piano and singing at the Royal Academy of Music, and published several songs for which she wrote both the music and lyrics. Over her career as a best-selling writer, from 1917 to 1947, she produced 28 novels.

Works

References

External links
 
 
 
 

1877 births
1948 deaths
20th-century British novelists
English women novelists
20th-century English women
20th-century English people